Reynier may refer to:

People
 Reynier (given name), Dutch masculine given name
 Franck Reynier (b. 1965), French politician
 Jean Reynier (1771–1814), French general
 Léon Reynier (1833–1895), French virtuoso violinist
Places
 Reynier, former commune in south eastern France
 Reynier Village, Los Angeles

See also
 Rainer (disambiguation)
 Reginar
 Regnier (disambiguation)

Surnames of French origin